Darren Hope (born 3 April 1971) is an English former professional footballer who played in the Football League for Stockport County.

Career
Hope was born in Stoke-on-Trent and began his career with Stoke City having joined from local non-league side Newcastle Town. He failed to break into the first team at Stoke and joined Fourth Division side Stockport County in March 1990 where he made four appearances. He went on to play for non-league sides Stafford Rangers and a return to Newcastle Town.

Career statistics
Source:

References

1971 births
Living people
English footballers
Association football forwards
English Football League players
Stoke City F.C. players
Stockport County F.C. players
Stafford Rangers F.C. players
Newcastle Town F.C. players
Footballers from Stoke-on-Trent